The 1998–99 UEFA Cup was won by Parma in the final against Marseille. It was their second title in the competition.

It was the last edition of the old format UEFA Cup, before the Cup Winners' Cup was merged into it to include domestic cup winners, and an extra knockout round was added. The new format was last played in the 2003–04 season and was later replaced by a Group Stage format in 2004–05.

Teams
The labels in the parentheses show how each team qualified for the place of its starting round:
 TH: Title holders
 LC: League Cup winners
 Nth: League position
 IC: Intertoto Cup winners
 FP: Fair play
 CL Q2: Losers from the Champions League second qualifying round

First qualifying round

|}

First leg

Second leg

Argeş Piteşti won 7–1 on aggregate.

CSKA Sofia won 3–1 on aggregate.

Omonia won 8–6 on aggregate.

Shakhtar Donetsk won 6–1 on aggregate.

Red Star Belgrade won 11–0 on aggregate.

Inter Bratislava won 4–0 on aggregate.

Polonia Warsaw won 5–1 on aggregate.

VPS won 4–2 on aggregate.

Kilmarnock won 2–1 on aggregate.

Mura won 8–2 on aggregate.

3–3 on aggregate; Zalgiris Vilnius won on away goals.

Hapoel Tel Aviv won 6–2 on aggregate.

Malmö won 7–0 on aggregate.

Germinal Ekeren won 4–1 on aggregate.

Rangers won 7–3 on aggregate.

Oţelul Galaţi won 4–1 on aggregate.

IFK Göteborg won 7–0 on aggregate.

Ferencváros won 14–1 on aggregate.

Anderlecht won 6–0 on aggregate.

Wisła Kraków won 7–0 on aggregate.

Second qualifying round

|}

First leg

Second leg

Red Star Belgrade won 4–2 on aggregate.

AEK Athens won 6–4 on aggregate.

Servette won 5–3 on aggregate.

4–4 on aggregate; Argeş Piteşti won on away goals.

CSKA Sofia won 2–0 on aggregate.

2–2 on aggregate; Fenerbahçe won on away goals.

Silkeborg won 2–0 on aggregate.

Rangers won 2–0 on aggregate.

Slavia Prague won 4–2 on aggregate.

Zürich won 6–3 on aggregate.

Brann won 1–0 on aggregate.

Wisła Kraków won 7–2 on aggregate.

Vejle won 6–0 on aggregate.

1–1 on aggregate; Strømsgodset won 4–2 on penalties.

3–3 on aggregate; Anderlecht won on away goals.

3–3 on aggregate; Rapid Wien won on away goals.

Grazer AK won 3–0 on aggregate.

Dynamo Moscow won 2–0 on aggregate.

Hajduk Split won 3–2 on aggregate.

Sigma Olomouc won 4–0 on aggregate.

First round

|}
 1 The first leg of the Fiorentina vs. Hajduk Split tie was played at the Stadio San Nicola in Bari instead of Fiorentina's home ground in Florence due to the club serving a stadium ban over an incident during their 1996–97 Cup Winners' Cup semifinal second leg match against Barcelona on 24 April 1997. The incident saw Barcelona player Iván de la Peña requiring medical assistance after getting hit with an object thrown from the stands as Fiorentina fans pelted the pitch with missiles following Barcelona's second goal in the 35th minute of the match. Part of the punishment for Fiorentina was being required to play their next two European home matches at least 300 km away from their home stadium. Since Fiorentina failed to qualify for European competition in the 1997–98 season, the punishment was enacted during their 1998–99 UEFA Cup campaign.
 2 The return leg of the Atlético Madrid vs. Obilić tie was played at the Partizan Stadium in Belgrade due to Obilić's home ground not meeting UEFA standards for European competition.

First leg

Second leg

Wisła Kraków won 5–0 on aggregate.

1–1 on aggregate; Slavia Prague won 5–4 on penalties.

Bologna won 4–1 on aggregate.

Willem II won 6–0 on aggregate.

2–2 on aggregate; CSKA Sofia won on away goals.

Dynamo Moscow won 5–4 on aggregate.

Fiorentina won 2–1 on aggregate.

Aston Villa won 6–2 on aggregate.

Grazer AK won 3–1 on aggregate.

3–3 on aggregate; Red Star Belgrade won 4–3 on penalties.

Werder Bremen won 4–2 on aggregate.

Zürich won 7–2 on aggregate.

Marseille won 6–2 on aggregate.

Real Sociedad won 5–2 on aggregate.

Stuttgart won 4–3 on aggregate.

Vitesse won 6–3 on aggregate.

Monaco won 3–1 on aggregate.

Grasshoppers won 2–0 on aggregate.

Club Brugge won 7–2 on aggregate.

Bordeaux won 3–2 on aggregate.

Atlético Madrid won 3–0 on aggregate.

Parma won 3–2 on aggregate.

Celtic won 4–2 on aggregate.

Roma won 3–0 on aggregate.

Liverpool won 8–0 on aggregate.

Bayer Leverkusen won 2–1 on aggregate.

Lyon won 3–2 on aggregate.

Celta de Vigo won 8–0 on aggregate.

Real Betis won 5–1 on aggregate.

Valencia won 7–3 on aggregate.

1–1 on aggregate; Leeds United won 4–1 on penalties.

Rangers won 5–3 on aggregate.

Second round

|}
 1 The return leg of the Grasshopper vs. Fiorentina tie was played at the Arechi Stadium in Salerno instead of Fiorentina's home ground in Florence due to the club serving a stadium ban over an incident during their 1996–97 Cup Winners' Cup semifinal second leg match against Barcelona on 24 April 1997. The incident saw Barcelona player Iván de la Peña requiring medical assistance after getting hit with an object thrown from the stands as Fiorentina fans pelted the pitch with missiles following Barcelona's second goal in the 35th minute of the match. Part of the punishment for Fiorentina was being required to play their next two European home matches at least 300 km away from their home stadium. Since Fiorentina failed to qualify for European competition in the 1997–98 season, the punishment was enacted during their 1998–99 UEFA Cup campaign.

First leg

Second leg

Bologna won 4–1 on aggregate.

Bordeaux won 3–1 on aggregate.

Parma won 3–2 on aggregate.

Club Brugge won 4–3 on aggregate.

AS Monaco won 7–3 on aggregate.

Real Sociedad won 6–2 on aggregate.

Zürich won 5–3 on aggregate.

Lyon won 5–3 on aggregate.

The match was abandoned at half-time after the fourth official, Philippe Flament of Belgium, sustained a knee injury and bruising from a firecracker thrown onto the pitch by fans in the stands. At the moment of the incident, Fiorentina led 2–1 on the night and 4-1 on aggregate. Four days later at a UEFA emergency meeting, Fiorentina was kicked out of the UEFA Cup and the match was recorded as a 0–3 Grasshopper win. Future expulsion from European competition for Fiorentina was also considered by UEFA but eventually ruled out because of mitigating circumstances, specifically that the match, as part of an earlier punishment, was not played at Fiorentina's home stadium but in Salerno and credible evidence that the firecracker was likely thrown by fans of the local club Salernitana holding a grudge following a recent Serie A fixture between the two clubs.
Grasshopper won 3–2 on aggregate.

Celta de Vigo won 3–2 on aggregate.

Marseille won 4–3 on aggregate.

Roma won 1–0 on aggregate.

Atlético Madrid won 5–2 on aggregate.

2–2 on aggregate; Liverpool won on away goals.

Real Betis won 4–1 on aggregate.

Rangers won 3–2 on aggregate.

Third round

|}

First leg

Second leg

Parma won 4–2 on aggregate.

Bologna won 4–2 on aggregate.

Lyon won 5–3 on aggregate.

3–3 on aggregate; Bordeaux won on away goals.

Roma won 3–2 on aggregate.

Celta de Vigo won 4–1 on aggregate.

Marseille won 3–2 on aggregate.

Atlético Madrid won 5–3 on aggregate.

Quarter-finals

|}

First leg

Second leg

Parma won 7–2 on aggregate.

Bologna won 3–2 on aggregate.

Atlético Madrid won 4–2 on aggregate.

Marseille won 2–1 on aggregate.

Semi-finals

|}

First leg

Second leg

1–1 on aggregate; Marseille won on away goals.

Parma won 5–2 on aggregate.

Final

See also
1998–99 UEFA Champions League
1998–99 UEFA Cup Winners' Cup
1998 UEFA Intertoto Cup

References

External links

1998–99 All matches UEFA Cup – season at UEFA website
Official site
Results at RSSSF.com
 All scorers 1998–99 UEFA Cup according to (excluding preliminary round) according to protocols UEFA + all scorers preliminary round
1998/99 UEFA Cup – results and line-ups (archive)

 
UEFA Cup seasons
UEFA Cup